A Coin For The Well is the third EP by Fan Death.  It was released February 1, 2010.

Track listing

Personnel
Producer – Szam Findlay
Vocals – Dandilion Wind Opaine, Marta Jacuibek-McKeever
Music – Szam Findlay, Dandilion Wind Opaine,
Lyrics – Dandilion Wind Opaine

Additional musicians
Ariel Barnes – Cello
Max Murphy – Baritone saxophone
Dameian Walsh – Alto saxophone
Nimish Parekh – Trombone
Kent Wallace – Trumpet
Markus Takizawa – Viola
Mark Ferris – 1st Violin
Cameron Wilson – 2nd Violin
Parker Bossley – Bass (track 4)

Production
Mike Marsh – Audio mastering
Eric Broucek – Mixing
Leo Chadburn – String & Horn Arrangement/Conductor
Matt Anderson – Additional Drum Programming (tracks 2-5)
Kevin James Maher – Vocal and Bass Engineer
Scott Ternan – String & Horn Engineer

References

External links
 

2010 EPs
Fan Death albums